Studyonovka is a rural locality (a khutor) in Romanovskoye Rural Settlement, Olkhovsky District, Volgograd Oblast, Russia. The population was 20 as of 2010.

Geography 
Studyonovka is located in steppe, on the Volga Upland, on the bank of the Balykleyka River, 51 km southeast of Olkhovka (the district's administrative centre) by road. Romanovka is the nearest rural locality.

References 

Rural localities in Olkhovsky District